Conshohocken (Lenape: Kanshihàkink) is a borough on the Schuylkill River in Montgomery County, Pennsylvania in suburban Philadelphia. Historically a large mill town and industrial and manufacturing center, after the decline of industry in recent years Conshohocken has developed into a center of riverfront commercial and residential development. In the regional slang, it is sometimes referred to by the colloquial nickname Conshy.

The sister community of West Conshohocken is located on the opposite side of the Schuylkill River.

Etymology
The name "Conshohocken" comes from the Unami language and may be translated as “pleasant valley”. The name derives from either Kanshi'hak'ing, meaning "Elegant-ground-place", or, more likely, Chottschinschu'hak'ing, which means "Big-trough-ground-place" or "Large-bowl-ground-place", referring to the big bend in the Tulpe'hanna (Turtle River, or modern Schuylkill River).

Geography
Conshohocken is located at  (40.077135, -75.302009).

Conshohocken fronts the Schuylkill River. A rather sharp bend in the river at Conshohocken gives the Schuylkill Expressway, which hugs the far bank, a curve that is well known to regional radio listeners as the Conshohocken curve. Railroad tracks line both river banks, reflecting the valley's heavy industrial past as well as its continuing rail activity including Norfolk Southern and SEPTA. A rail trail portion of the Schuylkill River Trail also passes through.

Politics and history
Conshohocken was first settled about 1820 as "Matson's Ford" before, in 1830, it was laid out as a town and received its present name.

The Pennsylvania guide, compiled by the Writers' Program of the Works Progress Administration, briefly described Conshohocken in 1940:

Conshohocken has a city manager form of government with a mayor and a seven-member borough council.  The mayor is Yaniv Aronson.

The borough is part of the Fourth Congressional District (represented by Rep. Madeleine Dean), the 148th State House District (represented by Rep. Mary Jo Daley) and the 7th State Senate District (represented by Sen. Vincent Hughes).

On September 1, 2021, the borough suffered severe damage and disruption from flooding caused by heavy rainfall associated with the remnants of Hurricane Ida.

Demographics

As of the 2010 census, the borough was 88.7% White, 6.5% Black or African American, 0.1% Native American, 1.8% Asian, and 1.7% were two or more races. 3.5% of the population were of Hispanic or Latino ancestry .

As of the census of 2000, there were 7,589 people, 3,329 households, and 1,834 families residing in the borough. The population density was 7,720.4 people per square mile (2,989.9/km2). There were 3,518 housing units at an average density of 3,578.9 per square mile (1,386.0/km2). The racial makeup of the borough was 89.88% White, 7.77% African American, 0.08% Native American, 0.84% Asian, 0.01% Pacific Islander, 0.49% from other races, and 0.92% from two or more races. Hispanic or Latino of any race were 1.34% of the population.

There were 3,329 households, out of which 22.9% had children under the age of 18 living with them, 36.5% were married couples living together, 14.1% had a female householder with no husband present, and 44.9% were non-families. 36.0% of all households were made up of individuals, and 12.6% had someone living alone who was 65 years of age or older. The average household size was 2.27 and the average family size was 3.02.

In the borough the population was spread out, with 20.8% under the age of 18, 8.8% from 18 to 24, 35.9% from 25 to 44, 19.4% from 45 to 64, and 15.1% who were 65 years of age or older. The median age was 35 years. For every 100 females, there were 94.2 males. For every 100 females age 18 and over, there were 91.1 males.

The median income for a household in the borough was $43,599, and the median income for a family was $50,601. Males had a median income of $36,299 versus $30,541 for females. The per capita income for the borough was $22,128. About 4.2% of families and 5.8% of the population were below the poverty line, including 6.9% of those under age 18 and 12.7% of those age 65 or over.

According to the 2013 American Community Survey 5-Year Estimate, the median household income in the borough had risen to $73,750. The median income for a family was $88,049, and the per capita income was $41,144. 5.3% of families and 7.7% of the population were below the poverty line, including 11.3% of children under age 18 and 6.3% of those age 65 and over.

Climate 
Conshohocken is in the outer rim of a humid subtropical climate (Cfa). 

January is on average the coldest month, and July is on average the hottest. The hardiness zone is 7a.

Transportation

No numbered highways pass directly through the borough. The main streets in town include Fayette Street, which passes northeast to southwest, and Elm Street, which traverses west to east. However, two interstate highways pass just outside of the borough: I-76 (locally known as the Schuylkill Expressway)  and I-476 (locally referred to as "the Blue Route").

Conshohocken is served by two SEPTA Regional Rail stations, both of which are along the Manayunk/Norristown Line. The Conshohocken station is officially located at Washington and Harry Streets, and the other is at Spring Mill at the end of East North Lane, south of Hector Street. SEPTA provides Suburban Bus service to Conshohocken along Route 95, which runs between Gulph Mills and Willow Grove, and Route 97, which runs between the Norristown Transportation Center in Norristown and the Chestnut Hill section of Philadelphia.

Education
Residents of Conshohocken are served by the Colonial School District.

Private schools in the area include AIM Academy and The Miquon School.

Conshohocken Catholic School, of the Roman Catholic Archdiocese of Philadelphia, closed in 2012.

Economy
 Allied Universal headquarters East Coast
 AmerisourceBergen headquarters (2020)
 IKEA Conshohocken store and IKEA US headquarters 
 Fanatics
 The NBOME National Center for Clinical Skills Testing
 National Lacrosse League headquarters 
 Saladworks headquarters

Notable people
Da'Rel Scott, former professional football player
Anthony Zinni, United States Marine Corps general

See also
 Dragonfly Forest

References

External links

 Borough website

Populated places on the Schuylkill River
Populated places established in 1830
Boroughs in Montgomery County, Pennsylvania
1830 establishments in Pennsylvania